Dasht is a village in Golestan Rural District, in the Central District of Jajrom County, North Khorasan Province, Iran. At the 2006 census, its population was 1,132, in 305 families.

References 

Populated places in Jajrom County